The Lata Castle is a ruined medieval castle in the village of Lata in the Gulripshi municipality, Abkhazia, an entity in the South Caucasus with a disputed political status.

History 
The castle sits on a cliff overlooking a waterfall in the depth of a small river valley. Its walls stand in ruins, built of coarsely processed limestone slabs. There no towers or other accessory structures. Based on the type of fragments of pottery found at the site, the castle is roughly dated to the period from the 11th to the 14th centuries.

References 

Castles and forts in Georgia (country)
Fortifications in Abkhazia